Marjan Babamorad (also Romanized as Marjān Bābāmorād and Marjān-e Bābā Morād; also known as 'Marjān) is a village in Howmeh Rural District, in the Central District of Gilan-e Gharb County, Kermanshah Province, Iran. At the 2006 census, its population was 196, in 43 families.

References 

Populated places in Gilan-e Gharb County